Andreas Mikroutsikos (Greek: Ανδρέας Μικρούτσικος; born 1952 in Patras) is a Greek composer, lyricist, singer and TV presenter.

Music career
His top hits were Hameno Nisi (Lost Island), To Koutsouraki (Little Log), Kiklopaki (Little Cyclops) and Oso Girizei i Gi (As Long As The Earth Turns Around). In 1991 Greece participated in the Eurovision Song Contest with his song Anixi sung by Sophia Vossou (Greek: Σοφία Βόσσου), finishing in 13th place. An album with the same title was released the same year.

TV career
During the 1990s, Mikroutsikos presented the famous TV game show To Megalo Pazari (The Great Bazaar - Greek version of Let's Make a Deal). By moving from Mega Channel to ANT1 he was the first to introduce reality shows to the Greek public. His shows have been criticised by many, despite good TV ratings. Mikroutsikos presented the first and second series of the famous reality show Big Brother on the ANT1 channel. He also presented ANT1's music academy Fame Story.

Mikroutsikos moved to Alpha TV where he presented the reality show Apo Kardias (By My Heart). The show was banned by the Greek authorities after an episode in which a woman accused her husband of forcing her to agree to bestiality, specifically sexual acts with their dog. Mikroutsikos defended himself by saying that all the things presented through his popular show were pieces of the puzzle of our life and by closing our eyes we just ignore the problem. Mikroutsikos was nicknamed "realitaras" (reality trump).

Personal life
Mikroutsikos has been married three times, with Maria Dimitriadi, trainer Foteini Georganta and TV presenter Dimitra Roubessi. He also had a long-term relationship with singer Sophia Vossou. Mikroutsikos has a son, Stergios, from his first marriage with Maria Dimitriadi. Mikroutsikos, the son of a mathematician, has a degree in mathematics himself. As a youngster, he was a member of the Revolutionary Communist Movement of Greece.

Filmography

Television

References

External links
 

Greek songwriters
Greek television personalities
Greek television presenters
Living people
1952 births
People from Patras